Luigi Fioravanti (born January 22, 1981) is an American mixed martial artist who last competed in 2016. A professional since 2004, he is perhaps best known for competing in the UFC, but has also fought for M-1 Global and the Maximum Fighting Championship.

Background
Fioravanti grew up in St. Petersburg, Florida, attending Pinellas Park High School, where he participated in wrestling, winning a district title, while also practicing judo. He joined the Marines after graduating high school and was part of Operation Iraqi Freedom in 2003. Fioravanti started training in various martial arts such as Brazilian Jiu-Jitsu and kickboxing while stationed in California and Iraq with the Marines. After spending five months in Iraq, Fioravanti continued training and began his professional career in early 2004.

Mixed martial arts career

Ultimate Fighting Championship
Fioravanti began his professional MMA career 7-0 before losing to UFC veteran Chris Leben via unanimous decision. Fioravanti would then rattle off four straight wins, including two in the UFC, before dropping two straight fights against Jon Fitch and Forrest Petz.

Fioravanti would then split his last four fights in the UFC, before losing to Anthony Johnson and being cut by the UFC.

Post-UFC
Fioravanti has seen improved results since leaving the UFC, going 10–6 in his last 16 fights since being released, including a five fight winning streak that was snapped when he lost a unanimous decision to Andrei Semenov.

He faced Joe Doerksen at Score Fighting Series 1 on June 10, 2011. He lost via unanimous decision. Fioravanti faced former UFC welterweight contender Paul Daley at Ringside MMA 12 on October 21, 2011. He lost the fight via unanimous decision, putting him at three losses in a row.

Fioravanti snapped his three fight losing streak on May 18, 2013, when he submitted Edwin Aguilar in forty-two seconds at Flawless FC 3. Fioravanti followed up with a TKO win over Joshua Thorpe at Shamrock Promotions on October 12, 2013.

Fioravanti fought in the BattleGrounds MMA in a Single Night 8-Man Tournament. He lost his quarterfinal fight against Joe Ray via TKO in the first round.

Championships and accomplishments
Ultimate Fighting Championship
Knockout of the Night (One time) vs. Solomon Hutcherson

Mixed martial arts record

|-
| Loss
| align=center| 26–15
| Artem Frolov
| TKO (punches)
| M-1 Challenge 72: Kunchenko vs. Abdulaev 2
| 
| align=center| 1
| align=center| 2:11
| Moscow, Russia
|
|-
| Loss
| align=center| 26–14
| Ramazan Emeev
| TKO (corner stoppage)
| M-1 Challenge 63: Puetz vs. Nemkov 2
| 
| align=center| 4
| align=center| 5:00
| St. Petersburg, Leningrad, Russia
| 
|-
| Win
| align=center| 26–13
| Sergey Kovalev
| Submission (rear-naked choke)
| M-1 Challenge 59: Battle of Nomads 5
| 
| align=center| 2
| align=center| 1:56
| Astana, Kazakhstan
|
|-
| Loss
| align=center| 25–13
| Nodar Kudukhashvili
| Decision (unanimous)
| M-1 Challenge 55: In Memory of Guram Gugenishvili
| 
| align=center| 3
| align=center| 5:00
| Tbilisi, Georgia
|
|-
| Win
| align=center| 25–12
| Ruslan Khaskhanov
| TKO (punches)
|  M-1 Challenge 54 & ACB 12
| 
| align=center| 1
| align=center| 3:06
| St. Petersburg, Leningrad, Russia
|
|-
| Loss
| align=center| 24–12
| Joe Ray
| TKO (knees and punches)
| BattleGrounds MMA 5: O.N.E.
| 
| align=center| 1
| align=center| 2:39
| Tulsa, Oklahoma, United States
| 
|-
| Win
| align=center| 24–11
| Joshua Thorpe
| TKO (retirement)
| Shamrock Promotions: Fight Night
| 
| align=center| 3
| align=center| 2:54
| St. Louis, Missouri, United States
|
|-
| Win
| align=center| 23–11
| Edwin Aguilar
| Submission (rear-naked choke)
| Flawless FC 3: California Love
| 
| align=center| 1
| align=center| 0:42
| Inglewood, California, United States
| 
|-
| Loss
| align=center| 22–11
| Paul Daley
| Decision (unanimous)
| Ringside MMA 12: Daley vs. Fioravanti
| 
| align=center| 3
| align=center| 5:00
| Montreal, Quebec, Canada
| 
|-
| Loss
| align=center| 22–10
| Joe Doerksen
| Decision (unanimous)
| Score Fighting Series 1: Mein vs. Zaromskis
| 
| align=center| 3
| align=center| 5:00
| Mississauga, Ontario, Canada
| 
|-
| Loss
| align=center| 22–9
| Andrei Semenov
| Decision (unanimous)
| M-1 Challenge 25: Zavurov vs. Enomoto
| 
| align=center| 3
| align=center| 5:00
| St. Petersburg, Leningrad, Russia
| 
|-
| Win
| align=center| 22–8
| Mike Geurin
| Decision (unanimous)
| Raging Wolf XI: Mayhem in the Mist
| 
| align=center| 3
| align=center| 5:00
| Niagara Falls, New York, United States
| 
|-
| Win
| align=center| 21–8
| Mitch Whitesel
| TKO (submission to punches)
| WEF 45
| 
| align=center| 2
| align=center| 4:41
| Jacksonville, Florida, United States
| 
|-
| Win
| align=center| 20–8
| Arthur Guseinov
| Submission (rear-naked choke)
| M-1 Challenge 22: Narkun vs. Vasilevsky
| 
| align=center| 4
| align=center| 0:33
| Moscow, Russia
| 
|-
| Win
| align=center| 19–8
| Johnny Buck
| Decision (unanimous)
| Panama City Beach MMA: Brawl on the Beach 
| 
| align=center| 3
| align=center| 5:00
| Panama City, Florida, United States
| 
|-
| Win
| align=center| 18–8
| Woody Weatherby
| TKO (punches)
| M-1 Selection 2010: The Americas Finals
| 
| align=center| 1
| align=center| 2:51
| Atlantic City, New Jersey, United States
| 
|-
| Loss
| align=center| 17–8
| John Kolosci
| Submission (rear-naked choke)
| Hoosier Fight Club
| 
| align=center| 1
| align=center| 0:42
| Gary, Indiana, United States
| 
|-
| Loss
| align=center| 17–7
| Pete Spratt
| TKO (punches)
| MFC 25
| 
| align=center| 3
| align=center| 4:02
| Edmonton, Alberta, Canada
| 
|-
|  Win
| align=center| 17–6
| Shane Primm
| Decision (unanimous)
| Raging Wolf VI: Mayhem in the Mist
| 
| align=center| 3
| align=center| 5:00
| Niagara Falls, New York, United States
| 
|-
|  Win
| align=center| 16–6
| Matt Lagler
| Decision (unanimous)
| C3: Slammin Jammin Weekend 3
| 
| align=center| 3
| align=center| 5:00
| Red Rock, Oklahoma, United States
| 
|-
|  Loss
| align=center| 15–6
| John Alessio
| KO (punches)
| MFC 22
| 
| align=center| 3
| align=center| 1:34
| Edmonton, Alberta, Canada
| 
|-
|  Win
| align=center| 15–5
| Fabricio Nascimento
| KO (punches)
| Xtreme MMA Championships 1
| 
| align=center| 1
| align=center| 4:44
| Rome, Italy
| 
|-
|  Loss
| align=center| 14–5
| Anthony Johnson
| TKO (punches)
| UFC Fight Night: Lauzon vs. Stephens
| 
| align=center| 1
| align=center| 4:39
| Tampa, Florida, United States
| 
|-
|  Win
| align=center| 14–4
| Brodie Farber
| Decision (unanimous)
| UFC: Fight for the Troops
| 
| align=center| 3
| align=center| 5:00
| Fayetteville, North Carolina, United States
|
|-
|  Loss
| align=center| 13–4
| Diego Sanchez
| TKO (knee and punches)
| The Ultimate Fighter 7 Finale
| 
| align=center| 3
| align=center| 4:07
| Las Vegas, Nevada, United States
| 
|-
| Win
| align=center| 13–3
| Luke Cummo
| Decision (unanimous)
| UFC 82
| 
| align=center| 3
| align=center| 5:00
| Columbus, Ohio, United States
| 
|-
| Win
| align=center| 12–3
| Frank Camacho
| TKO (doctor stoppage)
| PXC 12: Settling the Score
| 
| align=center| 1
| align=center| N/A
| Mangilao, Guam
| 
|-
| Loss
| align=center| 11–3
| Forrest Petz
| Decision (unanimous)
| UFC Fight Night 10
| 
| align=center| 3
| align=center| 5:00
| Hollywood, Florida, United States
| 
|-
| Loss
| align=center| 11–2
| Jon Fitch
| Submission (rear-naked choke)
| UFC 68
| 
| align=center| 2
| align=center| 3:05
| Columbus, Ohio, United States
| 
|-
| Win
| align=center| 11–1
| Dave Menne
| TKO (punches)
| UFC Fight Night: Sanchez vs. Riggs
| 
| align=center| 1
| align=center| 4:44
| San Diego, California, United States
| 
|-
| Win
| align=center| 10–1
| Hidetaka Monma
| TKO (punches)
| GCM: D.O.G. 7
| 
| align=center| 1
| align=center| 2:31
| Tokyo, Japan
|
|-
| Win
| align=center| 9–1
| Solomon Hutcherson
| KO (punch)
| The Ultimate Fighter: Team Ortiz vs. Team Shamrock Finale
| 
| align=center| 1
| align=center| 4:15
| Las Vegas, Nevada, United States
| 
|-
| Win
| align=center| 8–1
| Stephan Potvin
| Decision (unanimous)
| APEX: Evolution
| 
| align=center| 3
| align=center| 5:00
| Gatineau, Quebec, Canada
| 
|-
| Loss
| align=center| 7–1
| Chris Leben
| Decision (unanimous)
| UFC Fight Night 4
| 
| align=center| 3
| align=center| 5:00
| Las Vegas, Nevada, United States
| 
|-
| Win
| align=center| 7–0
| Sean Sallee
| TKO (submission to punches)
| Absolute Fighting Championships 15
| 
| align=center| 1
| align=center| 1:32
| Fort Lauderdale, Florida, United States
| 
|-
| Win
| align=center| 6–0
| Tim Stout
| Decision (unanimous)
| Full Throttle 4
| 
| align=center| 3
| align=center| 5:00
| Duluth, Georgia, United States
| 
|-
| Win
| align=center| 5–0
| George Allen
| TKO (punches)
| Real Fighting Championships 2
| 
| align=center| 3
| align=center| 3:39
| Tampa, Florida, United States
| 
|-
| Win
| align=center| 4–0
| Hans Canko
| TKO (punches)
| North American Combat Challenge
| 
| align=center| 2
| align=center| 2:09
| Key West, Florida, United States
| 
|-
| Win
| align=center| 3–0
| Manuel Garcia
| TKO (corner stoppage)
| Absolute Fighting Championships 12
| 
| align=center| 1
| align=center| 5:00
| Fort Lauderdale, Florida, United States
| 
|-
| Win
| align=center| 2–0
| Thiago Goncalves
| Decision (unanimous)
| Absolute Fighting Championships 11
| 
| align=center| 2
| align=center| 5:00
| Fort Lauderdale, Florida, United States
| 
|-
| Win
| align=center| 1–0
| Kiel Reid
| Submission
| Obaktagon Challenge 1
| 
| align=center| 1
| align=center| 3:14
| Jacksonville, Florida, United States
|

References

External links
 
 

American male mixed martial artists
Mixed martial artists from Florida
Welterweight mixed martial artists
Mixed martial artists utilizing pankration
Mixed martial artists utilizing wrestling
Mixed martial artists utilizing judo
Mixed martial artists utilizing Brazilian jiu-jitsu
American people of Italian descent
Living people
1981 births
American practitioners of Brazilian jiu-jitsu
People awarded a black belt in Brazilian jiu-jitsu
American male judoka
Ultimate Fighting Championship male fighters